Douglas Saunders may refer to:
Douglas Saunders, Jamaican politician
Doug Saunders, Canadian journalist
Doug Saunders (baseball) (born 1969), baseball player